WAGS Atlanta was an American reality television show that premiered on the E! cable network on January 3, 2018 as a spin-off of WAGS. The reality show chronicled  the  lives of several WAGs (an acronym for "wives and girlfriends" of high-profile athletes)  in Atlanta, Georgia. The show was confirmed canceled in January 2019.

Production 
The series was announced by E! on May 4, 2017. The series is the second spin-off of WAGS. The show is set in Atlanta and will document the personal and professional lives of a group of WAGs. WAGS Atlanta premiered on January 3, 2018.

Cast
Brandi Rhodes, wife of Cody Rhodes
Hope Wiseman
Kaylin Jurrjens, wife of Jair Jurrjens
Kesha Norman, girlfriend of C. J. Mosley
Kierra Douglas, wife of Harry Douglas
 Niche Caldwell, wife of Andre Caldwell
Sincerely Ward, cousin of Derrick Ward
Shuntel "Telli" Swift, fiance of Deontay Wilder

Episodes

See also
WAGS (TV series)
WAGs Boutique
WAGS Miami
WAG Nation

References

2010s American reality television series
2018 American television series debuts
2018 American television series endings
American television spin-offs
English-language television shows
Television shows set in Atlanta
E! original programming
Women in Atlanta